The 2014 AFL Grand Final was an Australian rules football game contested between the Sydney Swans and the Hawthorn Football Club at the Melbourne Cricket Ground on 27 September 2014. It was the 119th annual Grand Final of the Australian Football League (formerly the Victorian Football League), staged to determine the premiers for the 2014 AFL season. The match, attended by 99,460 spectators, was won by Hawthorn by a margin of 63 points, marking the club's second consecutive premiership and twelfth VFL/AFL premiership victory overall. Hawthorn's Luke Hodge was awarded the Norm Smith Medal as the best player on the ground.

Background

The two teams met twice during the home-and-away season, with Sydney winning by 19 points at ANZ Stadium in Round 8 and Hawthorn winning by 10 points at the MCG in Round 18.

It was the second time that Sydney and Hawthorn had met in a grand final, having faced each other two years earlier in the 2012 AFL Grand Final when Sydney won by 10 points. The match was Hawthorn's third grand final appearance in a row, having also appeared in the 2013 AFL Grand Final when it defeated  by 15 points.

Media coverage

The match was televised by the Seven Network. The coverage commentators included Brian Taylor, Matthew Richardson, Cameron Ling, Tom Harley, Luke Darcy and Leigh Matthews.

The match commentary was conducted by Bruce McAvaney and Dennis Cometti for the Seven Network, marking the duo's sixth grand final appearance together as commentators since 2008 and their tenth overall. Individually, it was Cometti's sixteenth grand final and McAvaney's fourteenth.

A total of 2,813,000 people watched the Grand Final on television, making the Grand Final the most viewed television broadcast of the day.

Pre-match entertainment

Welsh singer Sir Tom Jones and English singer-songwriter Ed Sheeran both performed as pre-match entertainment at the 2014 AFL Grand Final. The two were the first international acts to perform at a grand final since American singer Meat Loaf's performance at the 2011 AFL Grand Final Both Sheeran and Jones were the first acts to be offered the sets by the AFL, with both acts accepting without hesitation. Jones said about the offer to perform at the game, "I understand there will be over 100,000 people in the stadium for the grand final which makes this spectacular sporting event something I'm really looking forward to. I also know that Australian football has really passionate fans so it'll be great to be a part of the atmosphere and excitement on the day." Sheeran said that the decision to play was not a hard decision to make, saying that "Having spent some time in Australia recently I know just how popular the game is and how big an event this will be."

Sheeran performed "Sing" and "The A Team" and was then joined by Jones to sing "Kiss", followed by "Mama Told Me Not to Come", "Delilah" and "If I Only Knew". Mike Brady performed "Up There Cazaly", a grand final tradition. Olivia Newton-John performed the Australian National Anthem, Advance Australia Fair.

A post-match entertainment show featuring Sheeran and Jones was also held. There was no half-time musical entertainment. The traditional Grand Final sprint held at half-time was won by Jordan Murdoch of Geelong, breaking Patrick Dangerfield's streak of three consecutive victories from 2011 to 2013.

Match summary

First quarter
The first quarter began with the teams going goal for goal in the initial 15 mins. Josh Kennedy drew first blood with a long bomb, before Paul Puopolo answered with his own long-range shot. Former Hawk Lance Franklin then got onto the scoreboard but Luke Breust replied to make it 2 goals apiece. But from that moment onwards, it was all Hawthorn as Brad Hill, Jack Gunston and Will Langford piled on 3 goals to finish the quarter. At quarter time, Hawthorn had a healthy lead of 20 points.

Second quarter
In the second quarter, Ben McGlynn goaled within the first minute in a bid to give Sydney some spark. However, it proved to be the start of a Hawthorn onslaught, in which the brown and gold piled on 5 unanswered goals and surged to a match-winning 47-pt lead. Breust and Hale added goals before Langford stormed through the centre and unleashed a bomb from 50. Luke Hodge, who literally smothered Port Adelaide  out of the Preliminary Finals a week earlier, then added another two, including a simple intercept from a disastrous Gary Rohan kick-in. Adam Goodes and Franklin temporarily stemmed the tide with two successive goals for Sydney, but when the dynamic Cyril Rioli intercepted another errant Sydney passage of play to gift Jarryd Roughead a goal, the Hawks led by a massive 42 points.

Third quarter
After the main break, Hawthorn continued where it left off, as Roughead and Gunston added more misery to the Swans. Kieren Jack and Franklin tried hard to put some respectability on the scoreboard with two goals but the Hawks surged again. Matt Suckling put last's season disappointment behind him with a goal; Roughead then added his third, before Langford dribbled one through miraculously from the boundary. Kurt Tippett pegged one back for the Swans but it was too little too late. At 3 quarter time, the Hawks were ahead by 54 points, with Hodge sealing the kiss of death, literally, on ex-teammate Franklin.

Final quarter
When Hawthorn kicked away with the first two goals of the quarter through Breust and Roughead, the only question is how much will they win by. Goodes snapped his second and Franklin added a fourth but these only made a dint into the margin. Shaun Burgoyne put the icing on the cake with a daring 50m goal but Jack cancelled that out with a brilliant snap. However, the finish belonged to Hawthorn once more as Roughead marked strongly for his fifth before Shaun Burgoyne extended the margin by over 10 goals again. In the end, Hawthorn won by 63 points in a canter.

Overall report
Hawthorn dominated the match from start to finish, applying pressure on the Swans that at times was brutal. Jarryd Roughead was the top scorer for Hawthorn kicking 5.1 and Lance Franklin was the top goal kicker for Sydney, kicking 4.2.

Norm Smith Medal

Luke Hodge was named the Norm Smith medalist (best on ground) with 10 votes, for his 35 possessions and 2 goals. He edged fellow midfielders Jordan Lewis (37 possessions) and Sam Mitchell (33 possessions), both with 9 votes, for his second Norm Smith Medal, having also won it in 2008.

Chaired by Nathan Buckley, the voters and their choices were as follows:

Teams
Sydney did not change its team from the previous week's preliminary final, while Hawthorn omitted Jonathon Ceglar and Jonathan Simpkin in favour of Cyril Rioli and Ben McEvoy. Rioli was returning to the team after missing almost three months with a hamstring injury; he had appeared for Box Hill for limited playing time in the previous week's VFL Grand Final, which was his only match practice leading to his selection.

Umpires
The umpiring panel, comprising three field umpires, four boundary umpires, two goal umpires and an emergency in each position is given below. Most notable among the umpiring appointments was goal umpire Chris Appleton's selection for his first grand final, who had repaired his career after serving a suspension in 2010 for breaking the AFL's anti-gambling rules by placing bets on an AFL game in which he was not umpiring.

Numbers in brackets represent the number of Grand Finals umpired, including 2014.

Scorecard

See also

2014 AFL finals series
2014 AFL season

References

External links

AFL Finals Series official website

VFL/AFL Grand Finals
Grand Final
Hawthorn Football Club
Sydney Swans